"I Do It" is a song by American hip-hop artist Big Sean, released via digital download as the first promotional single from his debut album Finally Famous (2011).

Composition
The track was produced by No I.D. and The Legendary Traxster. The lyrics "I'm high, I split an O in half, now it's a parenthesis" were quoted from Pat Piff's song "You Already Know".

Critical reception
Consequence of Sound wrote of the song that: "the delivery by Big Sean, manic, almost cartoon-ish in nature, and the beat, this bizarro bump that feels like the best-worst parts of old horror movie soundtracks cut together, work to make it vibrant and appealing, even if it feels overdone". HipHopDX noted that "I Do It" and fellow album track "My Last" both "showcase Sean's signature bravado and punchlines".

Chart performance
Upon the release of its parent album, "I Do It" debuted at number 99 on the US Hot R&B/Hip-Hop Songs chart and rose to its peak of number 92 the following week.

Music video
On June 14, 2011, the official music video for the track was released.

Charts

Certifications

References

2011 songs
Big Sean songs
Songs written by No I.D.
Songs written by Big Sean
Songs written by The Legendary Traxster